Alexander Mack ( 27 July 1679 – 19 January 1735) was a German clergyman and the leader and first minister of the Schwarzenau Brethren (or German Baptists) in the Schwarzenau, Wittgenstein community of modern-day Bad Berleburg, North Rhine-Westphalia, Germany. Mack founded the Brethren along with seven other Radical Pietists in Schwarzenau in 1708. Mack and the rest of the early Brethren emigrated to the United States in the mid-18th century, where he continued to minister to the Brethren community until his death.

Early life and founding of the Brethren
Mack was born in Schriesheim, Palatinate, in contemporary Baden-Württemberg, Germany, where he worked as a miller. He was born the third son to miller Johann Phillip Mack and his wife Christina Fillbrun Mack and was baptized into the local Reformed church on 27 July 1679. The Macks remained in Schriesheim throughout the Nine Years' War, intermittently seeking refuge in the hill country because of violence. Upon finishing his studies, Mack took over the family mill and married Anna Margarethe Kling on 18 January 1701. By 1705, the Macks became moved by the Pietist movement locally led by Ernst Christoph Hochmann von Hochnau and started to host an illegal Bible study and prayer group at their home.

In the early 1700s, Graf (Count) Henrich Albrecht Sayn-Wittgenstein  provided refuge to religious dissenters from other German states and elsewhere. Many were settled around the small village of Schwarzenau, including Mack and his followers. The era of toleration for radical Pietism lasted only until about 1740, but had few precedents at the time and was denounced by the rulers of most other German states. Schwarzenau is now part of the town of Bad Berleburg in the district of Siegen-Wittgenstein in the state of North Rhine-Westphalia. The school (now closed) in Schwarzenau was named in honor of Alexander Mack.

The initial group that became known as the Schwarzenau Brethren were inaugurated by Mack as a Bible study with four other men and three women. In 1708—having become convinced of the necessity of Believer's baptism—the group decided to baptize themselves, using a lottery system to choose who would baptize one another in the Eder.

Emigration to the American Colonies
In 1719, a branch of the Schwarzenau Brethren—led by Peter Becker—emigrated to Germantown, Philadelphia, Pennsylvania, Now the United States for religious freedom. Mack and several other Brethren emigrated to Friesland in the Netherlands because of pressure within the interfaith community in Schwarzenau in 1720. However, the Brethren in Friesland were impoverished, and the community was unable to sustain itself. In 1729, Mack and about 30 Brethren families sailed from Rotterdam for Philadelphia. The arrival of the 1729 emigrants immediately brought renewed vitality and new members to the American Brethren, who had become less active since their migration. Mack's leadership was pivotal in sustaining this vitality, and it noticeably slackened upon his death in 1735.

Teachings and writings
Prior to the formation of any strict doctrine, the Schwarzenau Brethren espoused several fundamental tenets that would define the Brethren movement, including a rejection of any coercion in religion (such as infant baptism), viewing Christian rites and ordinances as a means of grace, and the New Testament as the only creed and Rule of Faith. Mack was a Universalist and strict pacifist.

Footnotes
Some sources (e.g. ) cite this as Mack's birthday, others (e.g. Eberly) refer to this as his date of baptism.

Works cited

References

Further reading
 
Counting the Cost: The Life of Alexander Mack, 1679–1735, William G. Willougby (1979), Brethren Press

External links
Alexander Mack at the Global Anabaptist Mennonite Encyclopedia Online

1679 births
1735 deaths
17th-century Christian universalists
18th-century Anabaptist ministers
18th-century Christian universalists
Activists from Pennsylvania
American Brethren
American Christian pacifists
American Christian universalists
American clergy
American people of German descent
American philanthropists
Anabaptist universalists
Burials in Pennsylvania
Christian radicals
Christian universalist clergy
Clergy from Philadelphia
Clergy of Brethren denominations
German Anabaptists
German Christian pacifists
German Christian universalists
German Palatines
German Protestant clergy
German emigrants to the Thirteen Colonies
German philanthropists
People from Rhein-Neckar-Kreis
People of colonial Pennsylvania